The Estado Aragua gecko (Gonatodes taniae), also known commonly as the ring-necked clawed gecko, is a species of lizard in the family Sphaerodactylidae. The species is endemic to Venezuela.

Etymology
The specific name, taniae, is in honor of biologist Tania Cobo who collected the holotype.

Geographic range
G. taniae is found in northwestern Venezuela, in the Venezuelan states of Aragua, Carabobo, and Yaracuy.

Habitat

Behavior
G. taniae is predominantly diurnal.

Reproduction
G.taniae is oviparous.

References

Further reading
Rivas GA, Molina CR, Ugueto GN, Barros TR, Barrio-Amorós CL, Kok PJR (2012). "Reptiles of Venezuela: an updated and commented checklist". Zootaxa 3211: 1–64.
Rösler H (2000). "Kommentierte Liste der rezent, subrezent und fossil bekannten Geckotaxa (Reptilia: Gekkonomorpha)". Gekkota 2: 28–153. (Gonatodes taniae, p. 84). (in German).
Roze J (1963). "Una nueva especie del genero Gonatodes (Sauria: Gekkonidae) de Venezuela". Publicaciones Ocasionales del Museo de Ciencias Naturales, Caracas, Venezuela, Zoología 5: 1–4. (Gonatodes taniae, new species). (in Spanish).
Schmid M, Feichtinger W, Nanda I, Schakowski R, Visbal Garcia R, Manzanilla Puppo J, Fernández Badillo A (1994). "An extaordinarily low diploid chromosome number in the reptile Gonatodes taniae (Squamata, Gekkonidae)". Journal of Heredity 85 (4): 255–260.

Gonatodes
Reptiles described in 1963